Aruküla Basic School is a school, located in Aruküla, Estonia.
The headmaster is Avo Möls and the headteacher is Ivika Jegis.

External links
 

Raasiku Parish
Educational institutions established in 1981
1981 establishments in Estonia
Schools in Estonia
Buildings and structures in Harju County